Kim Chan (born 25 April 2000) is a Korean footballer currently playing as a forward for Busan IPark.

Career statistics

Club

References

External links
 

2000 births
Living people
South Korean footballers
South Korea youth international footballers
Association football forwards
K League 1 players
K League 2 players
Pohang Steelers players
Daejeon Hana Citizen FC players
Chungnam Asan FC players
Busan IPark players
People from Pohang
Sportspeople from North Gyeongsang Province